The Government of the Federation of Bosnia and Herzegovina, commonly abbreviated to the Federal Government, is the main executive branch of government in the Federation of Bosnia and Herzegovina, one of the two entities of Bosnia and Herzegovina. It is headed by the prime minister. The Federal president, in agreement with both vice-presidents of the Federation, appoints the Federal Government, upon consultation with a prime minister or a nominee for that office. The Government is elected after its appointment has been confirmed by a majority vote in the Federal House of Representatives.

The Federal Government has a prime minister and 16 ministers. It must be composed of eight Bosniak, five Croat and three Serb ministers. One minister from the minority may be nominated by the Federal prime minister from the quota of the largest constituent people. According to the Constitution, the 15% of the members of the Government must come from one constituent nation. A minimum of 35% of the members of the Government must come from two constituent nations. Also, one member of the Government must come from the group of the Others (minorities).

The Federal Government must have two deputy prime ministers from the other two constitutive nations. The Government of the Federation of Bosnia and Herzegovina exercises its executive powers in conformity with the Federal Constitution. The current government is led by Prime Minister Fadil Novalić.

Current cabinet

 Regarded as unconstitutional since 2010.

Notes

References

Politics of Bosnia and Herzegovina
Political organizations based in Bosnia and Herzegovina
Federation of Bosnia and Herzegovina